Banjara Hills  is an urban commercial centre and one of the most affluent neighbourhoods in Hyderabad, Telangana, India. This is an upmarket locality close to Jubilee Hills. This area was a hilly forest and was least inhabited in the past. Only few royal members of the Nizam's dynasty lived here, which was a hunting ground for them. Even with its history and status, this area now has completely been transformed to an urban commercial centre consisting of an array of high-end hotels, restaurants, night clubs and office buildings of global corporations. Banjara Hills is segregated by its road numbers, with each road having its own importance: the numbers start from 1 and end at 14.

Banjara Hills is considered the most expensive zip code in India according to Economic Times magazine and along with Jubilee Hills, is the most prestigious borough/city in the greater Hyderabad area to live in. Economic Times estimated that properties in Banjara Hills were worth "a whopping Rs 96,000 crore", an equivalent to US$20.7 billion (As of 8 September 2011).

The much neglected Banjara Lake is also located here.

History 

The land was first bought by Nawab Mehdi Nawaz Jung, a minister in the court of the last Nizam in 1927, who built his residence, Banjara Bhavan (supposedly inspired by Antoni Gaudí's works) here. The last Nizam suggested that the area be named after the Nawab, as the man responsible for its development. However, the Nawab stated that it would only be fair to name the area after its original inhabitants, the Banjaras.

The Banjara Bhavan was visited by Jawaharlal Nehru as well as Rabindranath Tagore, who wrote a poem inspired by the area.

Road No. 1 of Banjara Hills is now known as Mehdi Nawaz Jung Road, named in his honour.

Landscape
Banjara Hills is famous for its hotels, upscale restaurants and large shopping malls. Taj Krishna, Taj Deccan and Taj Banjara are well-known star hotels in this area. Many restaurants offer cuisines from all over the world: Chinese Pavilion, Ohris Banjara, 
Barbeque Nation, and Fusion 9. There are many retail business establishments. Big malls like the GVK One, City Center, Midtown, Ohri's, Alcazar Plaza, Zing Designs, among many more dot the skyline. The highest building in the Banjara Hills area is the commercial Laxmi Cyber Center.

The Jalagam Vengal Rao Park is in Banjara Hills. This park is very beautiful, has its own charm, and many locals visit regularly for jogging and relaxing. Most of the businesses are concentrated on Road No.1 and Road No. 3. Muffakham Jah College of Engineering and Technology is on Road No. 3. This college has one of the largest campuses in the city. It works under the management and ownership of Sultan-ul-Uloom Education Society, which also operates Sultan-ul-Uloom College of Law, College of Education, Junior College, and School in the same premises. KBR park, named after Kasu Brahmananda Reddy, is close to Road No. 3. A cultural centre, called Lamakaan, opened on Road No. 1 in 2010. The 400-year-old, Svayambhu Sri Lakshmi Narasimha Swamy Temple on Road No. 12 is famous for Grand Harinam sankirtans. Guitarmonk school is also there.

Hospitals 
 Basavatarakam Indo-American Cancer Hospital
 Cancer Clinics
 Omega Hospital
 Care Hospital
 Star hospital
 Elbit Diagnostics
 Surya Fertility Centre
 Century Hospital
 Virinchi Hospital
 Rainbow Hospital
 L. V. Prasad Eye Institute
 Asha Hospital
 Nova IVF Fertility Hospital
 Felicity IVF Fertility Centre

Transport 
TSRTC connects Banjara hills to parts of Hyderabad like Dilsukhnagar, Koti, Ghatkesar, and Khairtabad. New flyovers have eased traffic congestion towards this suburb. The closest MMTS train station is at Khairtabad. This suburb has a good road network, with roads being renovated constantly to accommodate high traffic during peak hours.

Localities
Somajiguda, Errammanzil Colony, Srinagar Colony, G.S Colony, Panjagutta and Jubilee Hills are nearby / adjacent areas.

References

External links 

Neighbourhoods in Hyderabad, India
Shopping districts and streets in India